The 4th Women's World Chess Championship took place during the 5th Chess Olympiad, held in Folkestone, England from 12 to 23 July 1933. The competition was played as a double round-robin tournament. Vera Menchik successfully defended her title. The final results were as follows:

{| class="wikitable"
! # !!Player !! 1 !! 2 !! 3 !! 4 !! 5 !! 6 !! 7 !! 8 !!Total
|- style="background:#ccffcc;"
| style="background:gold;"| 1 ||  || - || 1 1 || 1 1 || 1 1 || 1 1 || 1 1 || 1 1 || 1 1 || 14
|-
| style="background:silver;"| 2 ||  || 0 0 || - || 1 ½ || 0 ½ || 1 1 || 0 1 || 1 1 || 1 1 || 9
|-
| style="background:#cc9966;"| 3 ||  || 0 0 || 0 ½ || - || 1 1 || 1 ½ || ½ ½ || 1 ½ || 1 1 || 8½
|-
| 4 ||  || 0 0 || 1 ½ || 0 0 || - || ½ 1 || 1 1 || 0 1 || 1 1 || 8
|-
| 5 ||  || 0 0 || 0 0 || 0 ½ || ½ 0 || - || 1 1 || 0 1 || 1 1 || 6
|-
| 6 ||  || 0 0 || 1 0 || ½ ½ || 0 0 || 0 0 || - || 1 ½ || 1 1 || 5½
|-
| 7 ||  || 0 0 || 0 0 || 0 ½ || 1 0 || 1 0 || 0 ½ || - || 1 1 || 5
|-
| 8 ||  || 0 0 || 0 0 || 0 0 || 0 0 || 0 0 || 0 0 || 0 0 || - || 0
|}

References 

Women's World Chess Championships
1933 in chess
Chess in England
Sport in Kent
Folkestone
1933 in English sport
1930s in Kent
1933 in British women's sport